Major General Arthur George Denaro  (born 23 March 1948) is a former British Army officer. He led his regiment, the Queen's Royal Irish Hussars, during the Gulf War and later became Commandant of Sandhurst. He commanded the 5th Infantry Division from 2000 to 2003. He was the highest-ranking officer of overseas birth in the British Army at that time.

Early life
Denaro was born in Sungei Patani, Malaya on 23 March 1948 and raised in County Donegal, Republic of Ireland. He is the son of the late Brigadier George Tancred Denaro, CBE, DSO and of Francesca Violet (Peggy) Denaro (née Garnett). He was educated at Downside School in Stratton-on-the-Fosse, Somerset, England.

Military career

Denaro was commissioned into the Queen's Royal Irish Hussars as a Cornet on 2 August 1968. He was promoted to lieutenant on 2 February 1970, to captain on 2 August 1974, and to major on 30 September 1980. Confirmation of his service with the Special Air Service is given by the general himself in a book by Hugh McManners.

Throughout the Gulf War he commanded his regiment.  Prior to the war they had just arrived in Fallingbostel as part of the 7th Armoured Brigade (under the command of Brigadier Patrick Cordingley), part of 1st (UK) Armoured Division, and were engaged in training at Soltau. Denaro was recovering from a polo accident four weeks earlier when he had broken his skull in four places requiring a metal plate to be inset but was still taking part in the exercise. 
Describably "with breathtaking speed", (as vanguard of the British attack) his regiment hooked round the Iraqi right flank to cut off their line of retreat. His Challenger 1 tank "Churchill" has been preserved at the Tank Museum Bovington in its desert colours and Irish Hussars livery. Both Denaro and his tank are immortalised in the Terence Cuneo painting "The Basrah Road" the original of which hangs in the regimental museum of the Queen's Royal Hussars at Athlone Kaserne in Sennelager.

In 1992 he was appointed Commander of 33rd Armoured Brigade and later that year he became Commander of 20th Armoured Brigade. From 1994 to 1995 he served at the headquarters of UNPROFOR in the former Yugoslavia, as Chief of Staff of the United Nations Protection Force in Bosnia, before commanding British forces in Cyprus from 1995 to 1996. He was Chief of Combat Support for the Allied Rapid Reaction Corps in Germany from 1996 to 1997. He became Middle East Adviser to the Secretary of State for Defence in 1997.

In 1998 he was appointed Commandant of the Royal Military Academy Sandhurst and he commanded the 5th Division from 2000 to 2003, when he retired from the service.

Denaro has served as President of the Army Polo Association from 2002 and was Honorary Colonel of the Royal Gloucestershire Hussars and of the Royal Wessex Yeomanry from 2003 to 2009, as well as being Colonel of the Queen's Royal Hussars (Queen's Own and Royal Irish) from 2004 to 2008 before handing over to Brigadier Andrew Bellamy.

Later life
After retiring from the British Army, Denaro was adviser to Salman bin Hamad bin Isa Al Khalifa, crown prince of Bahrain, from 2003 to 2007 and he joined Strategic Real Estate Advisors and the Inspirational Development Group in 2007. He was appointed a Deputy Lieutenant for Herefordshire in 2008. In retirement he also became a Trustee of The Prince's Trust and is an extra equerry to the Prince of Wales.

He can still be found at a variety of events for the army and, in particular, for the Old Comrades Association of the Queen's Royal Hussars where he is known to all as "General Arthur". He remains as president of the Combined Irish Regiments Association (since 2003).

Since leaving the army, Denaro has made a number of corporate speaking and after dinner appearances, and is represented by a number of companies including "Military Speakers".

Personal life
In 1980, Denaro married Margaret Roney Acworth (Maggi), widow of Major Michael Kealy, DSO. Together they have one son (commissioned into the Queen's Royal Hussars in 2008) and one daughter, as well as the son and two daughters from Maggi's first marriage.

References

|-

British people in British Malaya
British Army major generals
Queen's Royal Irish Hussars officers
Commanders of the Order of the British Empire
Living people
People educated at Downside School
Commandants of Sandhurst
People from County Donegal
British Army personnel of the Gulf War
Deputy Lieutenants of Herefordshire
Special Air Service officers
Graduates of the Royal Military Academy Sandhurst
1948 births